The Underwater Photography World Championships is the peak international event for the underwater sport of underwater photography.  The event is conducted on behalf of the Confédération Mondiale des Activités Subaquatiques (CMAS) by an affiliated national federation.  The championships was first held in 1985.
Two variants of the championship are offered.  The first is held at an open water site and has been conducted on 16 occasions as of November 2017.  Its official title often includes the world ‘sea’ in order to distinguish it from the second which is held in a swimming pool.  The swimming pool variant which is concerned with a number of creative categories has held twice with a third championship scheduled for Bari, Italy during 2004 being cancelled due to low competitor registration.

History

Future championships 
The 17th CMAS Underwater Photography World Championship will be held at Tenerife from October 15–20, 2019, Spain. The next CMAS Underwater Photography World Championship Swimming Pool will be held November 13–17, 2019 in Berlin, Germany.

See also

References

External links
CMAS 8th underwater photography
13th CMAS World Championships Underwater Photography / Bodrum, Turkey 2011, Trailer
14th CMAS Underwater Photography World Championship Cuba
2015 CMAS World Championship of Underwater Photography - promotional video

Underwater photography (sport)
Photography
Photography events